Lindera aggregata is a plant species belonging to the genus Lindera.

Other names
Engl.: evergreen lindera, Japanese evergreen spicebush.
TCM: trad.烏藥, simpl. 乌药 or 乌乐, pinyin : wūyào.
Bot. syn.: Benzoin strychnifolium (Sieb. & Zucc.) Kuntze, Daphnidium strychnifolium Sieb. & Zucc., Laurus aggregata Sims, Lindera eberhardtii Lecomte, Lindera strychnifolia (Sieb. & Zucc.) Fern.

Use
乌药, radix lindera, is present in the Compendium of Materia Medica and Kampo herb list. It is an ingredient in the traditional Chinese medicine pill Chaihu Shugan Wan against "stagnation of liver qi, distension of chest and hypochondria, indigestion, and acid eructation", and in the Lindera Combination Teapills (simpl. 天台乌药丸, trad. 天臺烏藥丸, pinyin : tiāntái wūyào wán), a Chinese classic herbal formula.

Biochemistry
An A type proanthocyanidin trimer (epicatechin-(4β→8,2β→O→7)-entcatechin-(4β-8)-catechin) can be found in Lindera aggregata. In a study this compound showed cytoprotective action against ethanol-induced gastric injury in Sprague-Dawley rats.

Four alkaloids (boldine, norboldine, reticuline and linderegatine) can also be found in L. aggregata.

References

aggregata